A fansub (short for fan-subtitled) is a version of a foreign film or foreign television program, typically anime or dorama which has been translated by fans (as opposed to an officially licensed translation done by paid professionals) and subtitled into a language usually other than that of the original.

Process 
The practice of making fansubs is called fansubbing and is done by a fansubber. Fansubbers typically form groups to divide the work. The first distribution media of fansubbed material was VHS and Betamax tapes.

Early fansubs were produced using analog video editing equipment. First, a copy of the original source material or raw was obtained, most commonly from a commercial laserdisc. VHS tapes or even a homemade recording could be used as well but would produce a lower quality finished product. The dialogue was then translated into a script that was then timed to match the dialogue and typeset for appearance. The two most popular programs used in the process were JACOsub for the Amiga and Substation Alpha for Microsoft Windows.

The next step was to produce one or more masters, a high-quality copy of the finished fansub from which many distribution copies could be made. The fansubber would playback the raw video through a computer equipped with a genlock in order to generate the subtitles and then overlay them on the raw signal. The hardware most often used was an Amiga computer, as most professional genlocks were prohibitively expensive. The final output of the arrangement was then recorded. The master was most often recorded onto S-VHS tape in an attempt to maximize quality, though some fansubbers used the less expensive VHS or Beta. Once it was completed, the master copy was sent to a distributor.

Digisubs
The internet allows for highly collaborative fansubbing, and each member of a fansub team may only complete one task. Online fansubbing communities such as DameDesuYo are able to release a fully subtitled episode (including elaborate karaoke with translation, kana, and kanji for songs, as well as additional remarks and translations of signs) within 24 hours of an episode's debut in Japan.

The production of a fansub typically begins with obtaining the unsubtitled source video called a "raw" that typically comes from DVDs, VHS tapes, television broadcasts, peer-to-peer networks, and directly from Japanese-based contacts. Then, a translator watches the video and produces a time-stamped text file of the screenplay with any relevant notes. The same series or episode may be subtitled by multiple groups with independent translations of varying quality. Fansub groups sometimes translate other already translated fansubs that are more susceptible to more errors. Translated text is assigned with start and end times in a process known as timing to ensure subtitles appear when dialogue is spoken and disappear with the silence. An editor and a translation-checker read over the script to ensure that English is natural and coherent while still retaining the original meaning. A typesetter then appearance for the dialogue, signs, translator notes, etc. Then groups perform quality control to catch any final errors.

Encoders then take the script file and create a single subtitled video file, often aiming for a target file size or video quality. "Hard" subtitles, or hard subs, are encoded into the footage, and thus become hard to remove from the video without losing video quality. "Soft" subtitles, or soft subs, are subtitles applied at playback time from a subtitle datafile, either mixed directly into the video file (.mkv, .ogm, etc.), or in a separate file (.ssa, .srt, etc.). Soft subs can also be rendered at higher resolutions, which can make for easier reading if the viewer is upscaling the file, but also are more difficult to blend into the video (for instance rotated text/moving text). Hard subs have traditionally been more popular than softsubs, due to a lack of player support and worries over plagiarism, but most fansub groups now release a softsub version of their releases.

The resulting fansub is a digital video file and can be distributed via CD, DVD, DDL, P2P software, and by file-sharing bots on IRC and also FTP. The distribution is usually handled by a distribution team, or "distro" team, composed of one or more individuals with a server or very high upload speed.

History

Pre-fansubs (pre–1970s)
The first documented Japanese animation to be distributed in the United States was The Tale of the White Serpent airing on March 15, 1961. Until the late 1970s, Japanese community TV stations' broadcasts were aimed exclusive at very young children. Soon after the release video cassette recorders in November 1975, post-Astro Boy anime began to spread throughout the United States. By March 1976, TV stations in the United States began broadcasting super robot shows such as Getter Robo, and due to the availability of VCRs, fans could record these shows to show to their friends. Fred Patten describes his first exposure to anime at the Los Angeles Science Fiction Society (LASFS) in 1976 when he met up with another fan who was an early adopter of Sony's betamax technology. By May 1977 he and a group of fans founded the first anime club in the United States, the Cartoon/Fantasy Organization (C/FO).

In November 1977, the C/FO began corresponding with other Japanese animation fans across the country and because the distribution of shows across the United States was different based on location, fans began trading tapes of shows they were missing between each other. At the time many LASFS members maintained contact with members around the world, and thus C/FO members began exchanging videos with fans located in Japan, typically US military personnel, who wanted Star Trek and Battlestar Galactica. Fortunately, shows from either the United States or Japan could be played in either region as both used the NTSC format for broadcast. These shows were not translated, however, Japanese animations remained simple enough that the average viewer could discern the plot exclusively from the visuals. By 1979, fans and clubs of Japanese animation had begun to separate from the science fiction movement and began to refer to the media they watched as anime.

Throughout this period it was considered socially acceptable to screen anime for an audience without consent as few companies had American offices, and of the few that did, the answer was invariably "no". Japanese companies made it apparent that they knew fans in the United States engaged in unauthorized distribution and screening, however knew that fans were not profiting. Japanese companies asked fans to help them publicize, for instance, Toei Animation asked the C/FO to aid it with some marketing research at San Diego Comic-Con. Starting in 1978, Japanese companies tried to set up their own American divisions; however, with the exception of the film The Sea Prince and the Fire Child which was licensed to RCA/Columbia Pictures Home Video, they realized they were not going to succeed in the American market and the last American anime company branch closed in 1982.

Growth of anime fanclubs (1980s)
After anime companies pulled out of the United States in 1982, there were no longer any legal or moral forces to discourage fans from copying and distributing tapes among themselves. From the late 1970s until the late 1980s, clubs began expanding to have chapters in other cities and grew to become of national and international scales. As the fandom grew, fans begun to experience ideological conflicts such as whether to keep the fandom niche or not. The visual quality of tapes began to degrade as fans made copies of copies; by the early 1980s some C/FO members reported tapes in their 15th to 20th generation that were extremely poor quality. In the mid to late 1980s, fans began to make booklets containing the translated dialogue for entire films (typically $2–3 to cover costs) and anime-focused magazines.

Despite numerous attempts, any efforts to convince US companies to license Japanese animation fail with the exception of a handful of companies that were intent on "carving up" any series rewriting them into kiddy cartoons. Sean Leonard states that entertainment executives at the time mistakenly assumed thought that anime were cartoons, therefore must be marketed at young children; furthermore Japanese animated dramas and such were much too violent and complex in plot for children. Leonard states that the most notorious example was the translation of Warriors of the Wind released in the US in 1985 that left its creators Hayao Miyazaki and Isao Takahata appalled; Takahata exclaimed licensing Nausicaä was a huge error and no further Studio Ghibli produced films would be licensed internationally. These edits however were no worse than most other non-Disney animation films that were available in the US. Fans who obtained the Japanese originals of Nausicaä were inspired so as to organize an anime tour to Tokyo in 1986 to see Miyazaki's Laputa: Castle in the Sky and landmarks in anime.

Carl Macek played a key role in creating a pivotal wave of anime fans. Macek ran a comic book and movie memorabilia specialty shop. After assisting in marketing and promotion of Heavy Metal and the recent establishment of a nearby C/FO chapter, he began researching Japanese animation and imported Japanese cels becoming known as a Japanese animation specialist. Harmony Gold then contacted him as they had acquired international licenses for several series, were planning on distributing in Latin America, Europe, and the US, and enlisted his help for the US market. After Macek noticed their selection of Macross and similar science fiction series, Macek obtained Harmony Gold's approval to release an anime if he could edit three series together into what they named, Robotech. Macek went to science fiction conventions to promote the series and discovered the growing cult interest among adolescents and young adults, in contrast to the assumption of an exclusively viable child-targeted market. Macek edits Macross, Southern Cross, and Genesis Climber MOSPEADA together into Robotech and lands a resounding commercial success earning him a lot of notoriety in fan community. Leonard describes as it being more faithful to the original series than any other commercial success at the time as it included key elements such as the first love triangle on both Japanese and American animated television.

The C/FO was at its height between 1985 and 1989 with over three dozen chapters throughout the US. John Renault helped lead the C/FO chapter in Japan and played a key role throughout fansub history due to his ability with Japanese, anime industry contacts, and military background. Renault helped exchange raws from Japan, wrote informative articles about production, translated booklets, introduced military techniques to anime distribution, provided plot synopses that proved invaluable for watching Japanese only anime. Fan distribution through C/FO’s efforts, particularly C/FO Rising Sun, sought to keep anime free but keep anime controlled within the C/FO organization in order to promote Japanese animation. Bootlegging at the time was economically infeasible. However a growing divide in fandom between the "haves" and "have-nots" limited access to anime as a function of who you knew. In 1989 members began to accuse Patten of disloyalty for writing articles for general magazines rather than the perpetually behind schedule C/FO fanzine. However Patten felt that in writing for popular magazines he was furthering their cause to proselytize and promote anime. With no clear succession route left behind after Patten stepped down, the C/FO began to break apart, and eventually ceased to exist as a conglomerate in July 1989.

Early fansubs (1980s)
The first known fansub documented at the Rising Sun chapter of the C/FO was in 1986 of a Lupin III episode produced on the Amiga, marking the introduction of the formula for the process of fansubbing. However fansubbing was extremely expensive at this time (on the order of $4000 in 1986 and over one hundred hours). There were a few ventures into subtitling in the late 1980s; Leonard labels the fansub of the first two episodes of Ranma ½ in May 1989 as the earliest, widely distributed fansub.

Distribution and playback (1990s, early 2000s)

In the late 1990s and early 2000s, fansubs in electronic form were primarily distributed like VHS and Beta tapes: via mailed CD-Rs. Many fans did not have high-speed Internet and were unable to download large files. Many of the early digital fansubs were made from regular tape subs.

In the mid-2000s, most fansubs were distributed through IRC channels, file hosting services and BitTorrent. In recent years most groups have shifted from using IRC to being primarily BitTorrent. BitTorrent trackers dedicated to anime fansub releases allow fans to easily find the latest releases, and individual fansub groups often use their own websites to inform fans of new releases. Because of an almost complete de-emphasis on CD-R and DVD-R distribution, file size standards are less frequently followed.

Legal and ethical issues
Hye-Kyung Lee, a lecturer at King's College London, states that anime fansubbers embody the general characteristics of fans described by John Fiske; fansubbers are motivated by a strong affection for anime, devotion to sharing it with other fans, the sense of community interaction with their viewers, working together as a member of a group, and a strong desire to support the local animation industry by promoting anime culture and widening anime's accessibility. Lee describes fansubbers as involved in productive activities that enhance their knowledge of anime and improve their skills culminating in a final product. The goal of the first anime club, Cartoon Fantasy Organization, and its subsequent chapters was to proselytize and promote anime. Sean Leonard and Lee agree that without fan distribution that began in 1976 till fansubbing 1993, the anime industry would not take off as it did in the 1990s. Some companies such as Protoculture Addicts with its titular magazine and Viz Media with Animerica drew their origins from anime club fanzines in the early history of fansubs.

Intellectual property lawyer Jordan Hatcher situates fansubs on the boundary between the desirable dojinshi fan culture and the "massive online file trading so vilified by the recording and motion picture industries". Legal scholar Lawrence Lessig states that the re-working of culture—remix—is necessary to cultural growth and points to doujinshi in Japan as an example of how permitting more remix can contribute to a vibrant cultural industry. However Hatcher states that fansubs do not match this type of remix because their aim is to remain faithful to the original. Furthermore, Hatcher states that fansubs compete with the original cultural product since they have the potential to replace the market need for official translations and thus resemble the debate over peer-to-peer file trading.

Hatcher states that copyright law does not condone fansubs. The Berne Convention, international copyright treaty, states that its signatories—including Japan—grant authors exclusive right to translation. Hatcher states that fansubs could "potentially" be legal within Japan given the nature of Japan's domestic copyright laws, although the target audience of fansubs is the non-Japanese market. However Hatcher states that copyright law in the United States—the frame of reference for most online discussions of fansub legality—construes translations as derivative, and fansubs infringe on the author's right to prepare derivative works and to reproduction by copying original source material.

Lee describes an unspoken rule in the fan community: "once the anime was licensed the fansubbed version should no longer be circulated". As a result, many fansubbers do not view themselves as pirates. Up until the late 1980s, fans were for the most part unable to obtain anime through official means, and the few anime that were licensed were rewritten to a much lower quality that even outraged the Japanese creators. Fans such as Fred Patten attempted to obtain official consent; however, no series really proved commercially successful. Until sometime after 1989 when subtitling became affordable signalling the rise of both fansubbing and the domestic industry, bootlegging was not financially feasible. Sean Leonard distinguishes fansubs from bootlegs as fansubs following the unspoken rule in the fan community with the intent to promote anime whereas bootlegs aim to make a profit. Many fansubs began to include a "This is a free fansub: not for sale, rent, or auction" notice as a response to bootleggers, and would encourage viewers to buy official copies. Anime Expo in 1993 was the first time the US industry representatives began talking more publicly about pre-existing copies eating into profits. For early fansubs due to the deteriorating nature of copying VHS tapes, official releases would be far superior in terms of visual quality, and thus there would be no competition between fansubs and official releases.

However, with the digital age at the start of 2000, each step of the fansubbing process was made easier and cheaper with a dramatic improvement to the visual standards of fansubs. Lee described English fansubbing as having been rapidly globalized over the years in terms of viewership. Lee states that it was the rise of peer-to-peer file sharing software BitTorrent that "put fansubbing on the map internationally". Lee states that while other language communities exist, the English language fansubbing community has the greatest pull. US publishers traditionally found fansubbing useful for testing demand and broadening their fanbase, whereas Japanese publishers treat fansubbing as something remote and insignificant. Lee states that some Japanese producers even praise fansubber's efforts at promoting their work overseas. However at the turn of the new millennium in the face of fans' demands for greater immediacy, temporal and spatial disparity in overseas licensing, English as the internationally preferred medium for fansubs, and the increasingly globalized membership of the English fansubbing community, fansubbing groups are becoming less and less willing to follow the unspoken rule. Some fansubbers state that they don't want to abandon the rest of the world because someone bought the region 1 license.

Fans' attitudes also seem to have changed. With a lower barrier to entry, even the least dedicated can view anime with a few clicks. Newer fans also seem less willing to purchase or collect DVDs. Consequently, the anime industry's view of fansubbing has changed. US companies have begun blaming fansubbers for the decline in DVD sales.

Henry Jenkins states that fansubbing has a positive impact on the anime industry through its function as publicity. However, as the internet grew in availability and speed, fansub groups were able to host and distribute fansubs online easily. The advent of BitTorrent as opposed to IRC has been pointed to as a key ingredient in the current fansubbing scene. It has been argued that this prompted fans to ignore official releases altogether, and some websites started charging for easier downloading rates. Many anime shows make their debut outside of Japan's shores in electronic format, and it is rare that a popular anime will go without fansubs.

Due to 4Kids' heavy editing of their properties and refusal to release untouched versions on DVD, some fansubbing groups continue to subtitle and release popular shows owned by the company such as Tokyo Mew Mew, One Piece, and Yu-Gi-Oh!. 4Kids attempted an uncut bilingual release of Shaman King and Yu-Gi-Oh in the mid-2000s, releasing a handful of volumes of each title in the format, but in an interview with ANN Alfred Kahn stated that "The market for them just isn't as large as the one for the cut version," pointing out that their sales might not have met 4Kids' needs or expectations to continue them.

Past market reactions have shown that time might be better spent petitioning 4Kids for a bilingual release, and supporting the uncut release of former 4Kids licenses like One Piece, to show them there is a market for such titles. An older example is Sailor Moon, which was initially licensed by DiC. After fan demand showed there was a market for the title, uncut, unedited versions of the show, and Pioneer successfully release the Sailor Moon Movies in a subtitled VHS format in 1999, followed by dubbed versions and bilingual DVDs. This was quickly followed by the release of Sailor Moon S and Sailor Moon Supers, which both received complete unedited releases on VHS and DVD from Geneon. In 2003, the commercial subtitles of the first two seasons appeared, released by ADV Films under license by DIC, nearly completing the uncut release that many fans never believed would be possible (Prior to Viz Media obtaining the license, the final season of the original Sailor Moon Series "Sailor Stars" was not commercially released in the United States.).

There is a belief among some fans that an "unspoken agreement" exists between the fansubbers and Japanese copyright holders that fansubs help promote a product. Steve Kleckner of Tokyopop noted:Frankly, I find it kind of flattering, not threatening[...] To be honest, I believe that if the music industry had used downloading and file sharing properly, it would have increased their business, not eaten into it. And, hey, if you get 2,000 fans saying they want a book you've never heard of, well, you gotta go out and get it."
This belief was challenged when in December 2004 Media Factory, itself  a Japanese copyright holder, directly requested that its works be removed from download sites and since then numerous other companies such as Nippon TV have followed suit in the wake of the appearance of fansubs on YouTube.

Recently, a few titles such as Street Fighter Alpha: Generations were prelicensed, meaning that they were released simultaneously in Japan and North America, in an effort to negate the need for fansubs. However, some fansubbing of such titles still occurs, as some people prefer fansubs over commercial releases.

Fansub opposers claim that Japanese licensors have reportedly grown discontent with fansubbers because the ease of access with which their works are obtained has begun to affect foreign licensees' willingness to license a series, as evidenced by the Western market's sharp drop in new acquisitions in 2005. They also suggest that anime fans in Japan have reportedly begun to turn to English fansubs which often appear days after a show's release, affecting sales in their home market. Indeed, Japanese companies have banded together to form JASRAC, a copyright holders' rights company, which has frequently taken YouTube to task for providing content which domestic Japanese viewers often use, which includes fansubs, as seen on their official site. A growing anti-fansub stance has been taken by US distributors, as seen in Geneon and ADV's comments at the State of the Industry Panel at Anime Boston, as well as recent comments by Matt Greenfield of ADV Films at Anime Central:

"Answering a fan question on how ADV perceives the threat and challenge presented by fansubbers, Matt answered that while fan subtitling is hurting the industry both in the US and in Japan, 'the industry has to learn and adapt to new technology, and has to find ways to work around it.'"

Legal action
In 1999, Ryuta Shiiki, a former representative of SPE Visual Works Inc. sent a letter to a fansub distribution group to take down the illegal copies of the anime Rurouni Kenshin, because a company that was interested in the rights of said series notified the Japanese company about the illegal distribution of it. The group complied and the series was pulled from distribution. This is the first legal action via a cease-and-desist letter against a fansub in the United States.

In 2002, Hideaki Hatta, president of Kyoto Animation, sent a letter to a fansub group requesting the stop of illegal distribution of the anime OAV Munto. The fansub group complied and the distribution stopped. This is the first legal action via a cease-and-desist letter against the fansubbing of an anime title not available outside Japan. However, time later, it was confirmed that Central Park Media licensed the title in the United States.

In 2003, a fansubbing group known as Anime Junkies was involved in a conflict with the licensor and co-producer of  the Ninja Scroll TV, Urban Vision's even provided the pitch to Madhouse to create the series. Urban Vision sent a letter asking for Anime Junkies to stop hosting the licensed material, but Anime Junkies did not comply with the request and responded negatively to Urban Vision. Christopher Macdonald, an editor at Anime News Network, highlighted the ethics code of the fansubbing community and asked that fans not support Anime Junkies as a result of their actions.

On December 7, 2004, a Tokyo law firm representing Media Factory sent letters and e-mails to the anime BitTorrent directory AnimeSuki and fansub groups Lunar Anime and Wannabe Fansubs requesting that they halt the fansubbing and hosting of all current and future fansubbing productions. AnimeSuki and Lunar Anime complied, and shortly after, other fansub groups such as Solar and Shining Fansubs followed suit. Despite the request, Wannabe Fansubs and a handful of other fansubbing groups continued to produce fansubs of MFI anime series.

On July 27, 2006, the legal department representing the Spanish anime company Selecta Visión sent a cease-and-desist letter to the anime BitTorrent and fansubbing site Frozen-Layer requesting the halt of the fansubbing and publishing all of current and prior anime licensed by the company. The owner complied and, until 2013, established that all licensed anime in Spain was banned from the site, regardless of the status of the license.

In Singapore, anime distributor Odex has been actively tracking down and sending legal threats against internet users in Singapore since 2007. These users have allegedly downloaded fansubbed anime via the BitTorrent protocol. Court orders on ISPs to reveal subscribers' personal information have been ruled in Odex's favour, leading to several downloaders receiving letters of legal threat from Odex and subsequently pursuing out-of-court settlements for at least S$3,000 (US$2,000) per person, the youngest person being only 9 years old. These actions were considered controversial by the local anime community and have attracted criticisms towards the company, as they are seen by fans as heavy-handed.

On May 18, 2007, Anime News Network reported that the police in Poland and Germany seized the fansubbing site Napisy.org arrested at least 9 people related to it. These raids were orchestrated by the Polish Society of the Phonographic Industry (ZPAV), a collective rights organisation, and German authorities shut the site which was hosted on servers in that jurisdiction. In May 2013, that case was closed, as prosecutors decided to drop the charges due to the charged individuals' ignorance of the unlawfulness of their actions. The site Napisy.org is currently closed and it shows sites to watch legal content.

On May 19, 2007, the Spanish organization Federación Anti Piratería (FAP) sent a cease-and-desist against the website Wikisubtitles.net and their website provider Bluehost, requesting the closure of the site since the owners were profiting with the content of others, violating copyright laws. The webmaster complied and the site was closed. However, the webmaster published the source-code of the website. Since then, websites like Addic7ed, Subtitulos.es and Wikisubs appeared using the Wikisubtitles source code.

On July 9, 2013, the Swedish copyright enforcement agency Intrångsundersökning seized the servers for Swedish and English website Undertexter.se, a website that contained fansub scripts of several movies and series. On 2016, the owner of the website, Eugen Archy was prosecuted of violating the Swedish Copyright Act and was found guilty of copyright violation and the Attunda District Court sentenced him to probation. In addition, he has to pay 217,000 Swedish kronor ($27,000), which will be taken from the advertising and donation revenues he collected through the site.

On September 21, 2016, the Kyoto Prefectural Police in Japan arrested two Chinese company workers, Liang Wang and Wangyi Yang, on Wednesday on suspicion of violating the Japanese Copyright Act by uploading the anime series The Heroic Legend of Arslan: Dust Storm Dance and Fate/kaleid liner Prisma Illya Drei!! with Chinese subtitles. Both suspects admitted to the charge, and Yang claimed to be a member of a Chinese fansubbing group. This became the first known legal action against fansubbing in Japan.

On October 27, 2016, the Kyoto Prefectural Police arrested two Chinese individuals on charges of violating the Japanese Copyright Act. The two suspects were both located in Tokyo. The first suspect is a 29-year-old male living in Edogawa ward. The second suspect is a 23-year-old male college student. According to police, the first suspect is accused of fansubbing episodes of the anime Saki: The Nationals in Chinese and uploading the subtitled episodes on a file sharing service. The second suspect allegedly subtitled a different anime in Chinese, and similarly used a file sharing service, but the report didn't mention the anime.

On February 16, 2017, the Kyoto Prefectural Police arrested a 26-year-old Chinese man on the charge of illegally subtitle the anime Ange Vierge in Chinese and distribute it through a file sharing software. Police allege that the man is a member of the group Jimaku Gumi (sic).

On April 22, 2017 a judge in Amsterdam, Netherlands, declared fansubtitling illegal. The Dutch court declared that these translations correspond to the producers and no one else. In case they do not exist, they can not be created by fans. After this ruling, the creation of subtitles without the consent of the author of an audiovisual production is now considered a crime in the Netherlands. This is the first ruling in the world that values subtitles as intellectual property and that punishes with fines and imprisonment those who violate copyright laws.

On January 31, 2018, Sankei West and Asahi Shimbun reported that police departments from Kyoto, Yamaguchi, Shizuoka, Mie, and Shimane Prefectures in Japan, along with the Association of Copyright for Computer Software arrested four Chinese nationals for illegal fansubbing anime, manga and videogames. The suspects, who range in age from 23 to 28, are allegedly part of a translating group that distributed Chinese-translated manga, anime, and other materials online. The titles included Yuki Ochimura ni Ojō-sama!, Yu-Gi-Oh! ARC-V and Kimi ni Todoke. The Association of Copyright for Computer Software reported that one of the suspects, a 23-year-old female company worker from Niiza City in Saitama Prefecture, translated the 123rd and final chapter of the manga Kimi ni Todoke. Police from Kanagawa, Ishikawa, Gifu, and Shiga Prefectures also worked on the case. This is the first known arrest regarding illegal manga translation in Japan.

See also

 Fan labor
 Fandub
 Fan translation
 Scanlation

References

Further reading

 
 Leonard, Sean. "Celebrating Two Decades of Unlawful Progress: Fan Distribution, Proselytization Commons, and the Explosive Growth of Japanese Animation". UCLA Entertainment Law Review, Spring 2005.

Anime and manga terminology
Subtitling
Fan translation
Fan labor